Rhonda Burnough (born November 2, 1954) is an American politician who has served in the Georgia House of Representatives from the 77th district since 2017.

References

1954 births
Living people
Democratic Party members of the Georgia House of Representatives
21st-century American politicians
21st-century American women politicians
Women state legislators in Georgia (U.S. state)